Szczerców  is a village in Bełchatów County, Łódź Voivodeship, in central Poland. It is the seat of the gmina (administrative district) called Gmina Szczerców.

The village has a population of 8,164.

History 
The town had a history of Jewish migration and settlement, with 35 per cent of the population claiming Jewish ancestry at the start of World War II. Shortly after Hitler's forces invaded Poland in 1939, German troops arrived in the town at September 3, 1939. Polish and German troops fought bitterly between September 4 and 5, resulting in the near destruction of the town. The synagogue was burned, and its ruins dismantled after the war, while the majority of Jewish residents took shelter in nearby towns Zelów and Bełchatów.

Among the soldiers to perish in the fighting at Szczerców was Prince Oskar of Prussia (1915–39), a lieutenant with Nazi German Infantry Regiment 51 and a grandson of deposed Kaiser Wilhelm II, through his son Prince Oskar (1888-1958).

References

Villages in Bełchatów County
Sieradz Voivodeship (1339–1793)
Piotrków Governorate
Łódź Voivodeship (1919–1939)